The Rajkumar College (or RKC) in Rajkot, Gujarat is one of the oldest K-12 institutions in India. RKC has a 26-acre (105,000 m²) campus in Rajkot.

History
The foundation stone of Rajkumar College was laid in 1868. The institution was designed by Colonel Keatinge and was formally opened by the Governor of Bombay, H. B. Sir Seymour Fitzgerald, in 1870. The college was founded for the education of the princely order by the princes and chiefs of Kathiawad for their sons and relations.

In 1938, on the initiative of its founding members, the college became a public school (private school in American terms). The college is a founding member of the Indian Public Schools Conference and a member of the Round Square conference of schools, a worldwide association of more than 60 schools that allows students to travel between schools and tour the country or do community service.

In 2001 the college opened its doors to girls, in what has been a boys' bastion for over a century. The school has around 50 girls, with boarding facilities.

Another endeavor of the Rajkumar College Administration has been Priyalok Villas, a pre-school program for the kids; originally housed in a 1909 Hyde sanatorium but now housed in a different building. Whilst having its own domain, it has access to all the facilities of the Rajkumar College.

The school is expanding. The Rajkumar College for Girls, a secondary school was inaugurated on 24 March 2011; before this, the fully functional elementary co-ed school had flourished for a decade.

Inauguration of the Rajkumar College for Girls, Rajkot
The Rajkumar College for Girls was inaugurated on 24 March 2011, by Kamla Beniwal, governor of Gujarat. The principal, Mr. Thakkar, said that it was a special day for the Rajkumar family. Almost 140 years ago on 16 December 1870 the college was inaugurated by the governor of the Bombay Presidency, Sir Seymour Fitzgerald.

Student life
Sport teams from the college travel around the country to participate in inter public school competitions and district/state/national level events.

Co-curricular activities include public speaking/recitation/debates, bio-enrichment camps, and other cultural activities.

The college motto is Yasya Bhuddhi, Balam Tasya ("Power is where there is knowledge").

Notable people

Alumni
Chhatrapati Shahu Maharaj of Kolhapur: ruler of the erstwhile Kolhapur State 
Yashwantrao Martandrao Mukne, Maharaja of Jawhar State, the first Member of Parliament from Thane (Lok Sabha constituency)
 Krishnakumarsingh Bhavasingh, Maharaja of Bhavnagar State, the first Governor of Madras state
 Nawab Muhammad Mahabat Khan III, the last Nawab of Junagadh State
 Ghulam Moinuddin Khanji Babi of Manavadar State
 Sahibzada Omeir Ahmed Khanji Babi of Devgam Junagadh State
 Raol Shri Dharmakumarsinhji, prince, ornithologist and environmentalist
 Madansinhji – Maharaja of Kutch
 Natwarsinhji Bhavsinhji of Porbandar, Maharaja of Porbandar
 K.S. Digvijaysinhji, Maharaja Jam Sahib of Nawanagar
 Kumar Shri Duleepsinhji, cricketer
 Bhagvatsingh of Gondal, Maharaja, physician and architect
 Kumar Indrajitsinhji, test cricketer
 Rajendrasinhji Jadeja, commander-in-chief of the Indian armed forces
 Kavi Kalapi, poet
 Ruswa Majhalumi, poet
 Manoharsinhji Pradyumansinhji, 15th Thakore Saheb of Rajkot, cricketer and politician
 Ashok Kamte, Mumbai Police, additional commissioner for the East Region, martyr of 26.11.2008 Mumbai attacks
 Ranjitsinhji, test cricketer and later Maharaja Jam Sahib of Nawanagar
 Takhtsinhji, Maharaja of Bhavnagar
Sujan R. Chinoy, diplomat and China expert; Ambassador of India to Japan
 Maharaja Bhavsinhji II of Bhavnagar State
 Himmatsinhji Vijayaraji, noted ornithologist and a prince of Kutch State
 Bhavsinhji Madhavsinhji, the Maharana of Porbandar.
 Amarsinhji Banesinhji, the Maharana Raj Sahib of Wankaner
 Meghrajji III of Dhrangadhra-Halvad – past President of the College Council
 Lavkumar Khachar, ornithologist

Principals
 Chester Macnaghten, M.A., first principal of the school in 1870
 C. Mayne, M.A., second principal 1903-1923
 Herbert Barritt, principal in the early 1940s
  Mark Alexander Wynter-Blyth, M.A., principal 1948-1963
 Peter Rogerson, M.A., principal from the 1963 to 1991
 Rati Cooper, M.A., warden principal 1991-2000, principal emeritus 2000 
 Ayaaz Khan Babi, director 2000-2008
 Vinodkumar Thakkar, principal 2008-2013
 Shankar Singh Adhikari, principal 2013-2022
 Yash Saxena, present principal since 2022

Council presidents 
 Darbar Saheb Shri Mahipal Vala of Jetpur
 Thakor Saheb Chaitanyadev of Wadhwan – past
 Meghrajji III of Dhrangadhra-Halvad – past

See also 
 Rajkumar College, Raipur
 List of the oldest schools in the world
 History of the Indian cricket team

References

External links
https://www.edustoke.com/rajkot/rajkumar-college-sadar-residential
 Founding member of the Indian Public School Conference 
Forty Years (1870–1910) of the Rajkumar College. Rajkot abridged from the papers of the late Chester Macnaghten first principal of the college and other sources. Compiled by Sir H.H. Bhavsinhji, Maharaja of Bhavnagar.

Education in Rajkot
Private schools in Gujarat
Boarding schools in Gujarat
Schools in Colonial India
Boys' schools in India
Girls' schools in Gujarat
Educational institutions established in 1868
1868 establishments in British India
Education in the princely states of India
Round Square schools